Donnie Levister (born April 19, 1976) is an American professional stock car racing driver.

Racing career

Early years 
Levister began his racing career on dirt tracks near his hometown of Winnsboro, South Carolina.

Camping World Truck Series 
Partnering with Faith Motorsports to try and make his first NASCAR race, Levister announced that he wanted to attempt at least 15 races of the 2016 NASCAR Camping World Truck Series schedule. In his first attempt, he was forced to withdraw at Martinsville Speedway and the team scaled back its schedule, later Faith Motorsports partner with Mike Harmon Racing and his No. 74 truck to be higher in owner points, but Levister failed to qualify in the same way  at Iowa Speedway. The season did not get any better from there on out as two more withdrawals and failing to qualify for a race left Levister in search of his first series start at the end of 2016.

Levister found a ride for the 2017 Alpha Energy Solutions 250 at Martinsville with Copp Motorsports, a team new to the Truck series in 2017. Driving their No. 83 Chevrolet Silverado, Levister qualified 30th before falling out with brake problems after 100 laps, leading to a 30th-place finish. Meanwhile, after the Martinsville race Faith Motorsports purchased the No. 44 entry of Martins Motorsports and the team has hinted that Levister will drive the truck in future races; however Levister was ineligible to race in tracks with a length of more than 1.3 mile until Gateway, so Matt Mills replaced him at Kansas and Charlotte.

Motorsports career results

NASCAR
(key) (Bold – Pole position awarded by qualifying time. Italics – Pole position earned by points standings or practice time. * – Most laps led.)

Camping World Truck Series

 Season still in progress
 Ineligible for series points

References

External links
 

NASCAR drivers
Living people
1976 births
Racing drivers from South Carolina
People from Winnsboro, South Carolina